The International Conference on Emergency Medicine (ICEM) is a biennial conference on international emergency medicine for emergency physicians. It is organised by the International Federation for Emergency Medicine.

History
The first ICEM was held in London in 1986 as a collaborative effort between the American College of Emergency Physicians (ACEP), the British Association for Emergency Medicine (BAEM), the Canadian Association of Emergency Physicians (CAEP), and the Australasian College for Emergency Medicine (ACEM). It rotated between the United States, the United Kingdom, Canada, and Australia until 2010, when it was held in Singapore.

Emergency Medicine Journal calls ICEM a major international emergency medicine conference, while Kumar Alagappan and C. James Holliman refer to IFEM as "probably the most active, broad-based, international organization dealing with international EM [emergency medicine] development issues."

Locations
The International Conference on Emergency Medicine (ICEM) was held every 2 years. From 2019 it will be changed to a yearly conference.

See also
 Emergency medicine
 International emergency medicine
 EUSEM Congresses

References

External links
 ICEM

Emergency medicine
Conventions (meetings)
Medical conferences